A constitutional referendum was held in the Republic of Upper Volta on 27 November 1977. It followed the 1974 military coup, and would restore multi-party democracy. The new constitution retained the presidential system of government, and limited the number of political parties to three (the three with the highest number of votes in the forthcoming parliamentary elections would keep their status and other parties disbanded). It was approved by 98.70% of voters with a 71.6% turnout.

Results

References

1977
1977 referendums
1977 in Upper Volta
Constitutional referendums